Francis Lévy, (Vinça, 6 November 1930-Perpignan, 31 January 2009) was a rugby league player and coach. 
As player, he played as a utility back.

He knew several clubs during his career. He played for XIII Catalan with which he won the French Championship in 1958 and another in 1960 for Roanne. He also played during a season for Celtic de Paris before the 1951-52 season. Due to his club performance, he was called up 8 times for the France national team between 1955 and 1957, as well disputing the 1957 World Cup.

After his player career,he became a coach and won with Pia the Lord Derby Cup in 1975.

Biography 
He represented France in the 1957 World Cup alongside his teammates Henri Delhoste and Robert Médus.

Honours

As player 

 Team :
 Winner of the Championnat de France : 1957 (XIII Catalan) and 1960 (Roanne).
 Runner-up at the Lord Derby Cup : 1954 and 1957 (XIII Catalan).

As coach 

 Team;
 Winner of the Lord Derby Cup : 1975 (Pia).

References

External links 

  Francis Lévy profile at rugbyleagueproject.com

French rugby league coaches
French rugby league players
1930 births
2009 deaths
XIII Catalan players
RC Roanne XIII players
Celtic de Paris players
Sportspeople from Pyrénées-Orientales
France national rugby league team players